Aix-la-Fayette is a commune in the Puy-de-Dôme department, Auvergne-Rhône-Alpes, central France.

Population

See also
Communes of the Puy-de-Dôme department

References

Communes of Puy-de-Dôme
Puy-de-Dôme communes articles needing translation from French Wikipedia